Satyanidhi Tirtha (1580 - 1660) was a Hindu philosopher, scholar and saint. He served as the pontiff of Shri Uttaradi Math from 1638–1660. He was the 19th in succession from Madhvacharya. Satyanidhi Tirtha ruled the pontificate with a remarkable distinction. His life was a saga of supreme spiritual achievements.

Life
Most of the information about his life is derived from two hagiographies: one is Gurucarya, a hagiological work on the Pontiffs of the Uttaradi Math and the other one is Satyanidhivilasa by Sarkara Srinivasa. Born as Kaulagi Raghupathyacharya into Deshastha Madhva Brahmin family of scholars to Purushothamacharya and Satyadevi in Puntamba, Maharashtra. He studied Vyakarana and Shastras under Kumbhari Vasudevacharya.  He was ordained and was made the pontiff of Uttaradi Math in 1638. He served as pontiff of mutt for 21 years and 9 months. After his death in 1660, his mortal remains were enshrined in the mutt at Kurnool. He was succeeded by Satyanatha Tirtha.

Works
Satyanidhi Tirtha authored three works consisting of commentaries on the works of Vyasatirtha and a few hymns. They are as follows:

Bhedojjivana, a gloss on Bhedojjivana of Vyasatirtha
Vayu Bharathi Stotra, a praise hymn on Vayu and Bharathi.
Vishnu Sahasranama Vyakhyana, a commentary on Vishnu Sahasranama.

Legacy
Satyanidhi Tirtha has been eulogised by Sarkara Srinivasa in his contemporaneous kavya Satyanidhivilasa, a kavya in honor of Satyanidhi in 8 cantos. His disciple Satyanatha Tirtha sets forth the Purvapaksa and Siddhanta views under each adhikarana, and offers criticisms on the former in accordance with the views of his teacher Satyanidhi Tirtha, in his work Abhinava Chandrika.

References

Bibliography
 

 

Indian Hindu saints
Madhva religious leaders
Dvaitin philosophers
Uttaradi Math
17th-century Indian philosophers